Bom Jardim may refer to the following places in Brazil:

 Bom Jardim, Maranhão
 Bom Jardim, Pernambuco
 Bom Jardim, Rio de Janeiro